The 1913 Open Championship was the 53rd Open Championship, held 23–24 June at Royal Liverpool Golf Club in Hoylake, England. J.H. Taylor won the championship for the fifth and final time, eight strokes ahead of runner-up Ted Ray, the defending champion.

Qualifying took place on 19, 20, and 21 June. The top twenty and ties qualified on each of the three days. In windy conditions Laurie Ayton, Snr led the 21 qualifiers on the first day with a score of 152, with 159 as the qualifying score. Conditions were better on the second day and 156 was the qualifying mark; amateur Edward Blackwell led the 21 qualifiers with 147.  Jack Gaudin led the 23 qualifiers on the third day with 148, with 157 as the qualifying score. Seven American-based professionals entered but only two qualified, John McDermott and Tom McNamara. Mike Brady, Alex Campbell, Stewart Maiden, and Alex Smith failed on the first day, while John Jones failed on the third day.

Ray led after the first two rounds on Monday with 147; Taylor was at 148, Michael Moran at 150, and Thomas Renouf had 

Gale force winds on Tuesday led to high scoring in the final two rounds. Taylor and McDermott had the best scores in the morning at 77. Ray struggled and completed the circuit in 81, to trail Taylor by three shots, while McDermott was a further 4 strokes behind. Moran's chances were ruined by a third round 89 which included a ten at the first. In the final round that afternoon, Taylor holed from about 50 yards at the 14th, while his nearest rivals had poor starts to their rounds, Ray took eight at the third hole while McDermott took seven at the first. Moran had the best final round at 74, fifteen strokes better than his morning score, and tied for third.

The win was the fifteenth Open title for the Great Triumvurate of Taylor, Vardon, and James Braid, with five each.  Vardon won a record sixth the following year, the last Open victory for the three players.

Course

Past champions in the field 

Source:

Round summaries

First round
Monday, 23 June 1913 (morning)

Source:

Second round
Monday, 23 June 1913 (afternoon)

Source:

Third round
Tuesday, 24 June 1913 (morning)

Source:

Final round
Tuesday, 24 June 1913 (afternoon)

Source:

Amateurs: Graham (318), Lassen (319), Crowther (328), Blackwell (333)

References

External links
Royal Liverpool (Official site)

The Open Championship
Golf tournaments in England
Sport in the Metropolitan Borough of Wirral
Open Championship
Open Championship
Open Championship